Sir Joseph Savory, 1st Baronet (23 July 1843 – 1 October 1921) was a Sheriff of London, Lord Mayor of London and MP.

He was born in Clapton, London, the eldest son of Joseph Savory of Buckhurst Park and Mary Caroline née Braithwaite, at Winkfield in Berkshire which he inherited in 1879. He was educated at Harrow School.

He joined the family business of A.B. Savory and Sons and became an alderman of the City of London for the Bridge Without ward. He was appointed Sheriff of London and Middlesex for 1882 and elected Lord Mayor of London for 1890. He was a J.P. and Deputy Lieutenant for Berkshire and for Westmorland, where he was Lord of the Manors of Wharton and Nateby. He was made baronet in September 1891. In 1892 he was returned as MP for Appleby until 1900.

He was involved in the management of the New River Company and the Royal Mail Steam Packet Company.

He made several improvements to the Buckhurst Park estate and was a lay preacher who took morning services at nearby Chavey Down and preached in South Ascot.

He married Helen Pemberton Leach, daughter of Col. Sir George Archibald Leach, in 1888.
He is buried at St Marys Church in Winkfield, Berkshire.

References

External link

1843 births
1921 deaths
People from Upper Clapton
People from Winkfield
People educated at Harrow School
Sheriffs of the City of London
19th-century lord mayors of London
19th-century English politicians
20th-century English politicians
UK MPs 1892–1895
UK MPs 1895–1900
Savory, 1st Baronet
Members of the London School Board
Conservative Party (UK) MPs for English constituencies